Vladimir Shcherbakov may refer to:

 Vladimir Shcherbakov (footballer) (1945–1993), Soviet footballer
 Vladimir Shcherbakov (politician) (1909–1985), Russian economist and politician
 Vladimir Shcherbakov (general) (1901–1981), Soviet general

See also
 Shcherbakov (disambiguation)
 Vladimir Shcherbachov (1889–1952), Soviet composer